Sunisa is a given name. Notable people with the name include:

Sunisa Lee (born 2003), American gymnast
Sunisa Kawrungruang (born 1972), Thai sprinter
Sunisa Srangthaisong (born 1988), Thai footballer

Thai feminine given names